Richard Kent Austin (born June 25, 1963) is an American gridiron football coach and former player, who is currently a senior analyst under head coach Hugh Freeze at Auburn. Austin served as the head football coach at Cornell University from 2010 to 2012. He was the head coach of the Saskatchewan Roughriders of the Canadian Football League (CFL) in 2007 and CFL's Hamilton Tiger-Cats from  2013 to 2017 and the co-offensive coordinator and quarterbacks coach at Liberty University in Lynchburg, Virginia from 2019 to 2022.

College career
Following high school at Brentwood Academy, Austin went to the University of Mississippi and played quarterback in the early 1980s. He ranks fourth in passing yards in the Ole Miss records, behind Eli Manning, Bo Wallace, and Romaro Miller. Austin was an Academic All-American in each of his four college seasons and is a member of the University of Mississippi Sports Hall of Fame.

Professional career
After college, Austin  was selected in the 12th round (312th overall) of the 1986 NFL Draft by the St. Louis Cardinals. He played a single season in the NFL as the team's third-string quarterback, attempting a single pass.

In 1987, the Cardinals chose not to resign Austin, and he instead jumped to the CFL and joined the Roughriders, initially as their back-up quarterback. On November 26, 1989 in Toronto, Austin was at the helm of the Roughriders when they won the 1989 Grey Cup versus the Hamilton Tiger-Cats, winning the MVP trophy for his 474 yards passing in the game. One of the Top 10 quarterbacks in CFL history, with 36,030 career passing yards on 4,700 pass attempts, having completed 2709 passes (57.6%), Austin is a Roughriders legend for leading the team to its second league championship (Grey Cup).  He also threw 198 touchdown passes and 191 interceptions in his 10 CFL seasons with four teams.

Austin started at quarterback for the Roughriders, British Columbia Lions, and Toronto Argonauts (the second Ole Miss star to play quarterback for Toronto, the first being Eagle Day in 1967), as well as serving as a backup for the Winnipeg Blue Bombers. He is one of only four CFL quarterbacks to pass for more than 6,000 yards in a single season (6,225 in 1992 with Saskatchewan). Austin won his second Grey Cup in 1994 with the British Columbia Lions, starting the 82nd Grey Cup but being replaced at halftime by Danny McManus due to an injury. McManus would lead the Lions to a win on a last-second field goal.

In the Columbo episode "A Bird in the Hand..." (air date November 22, 1992), footage from a Saskatchewan Roughriders versus Edmonton Eskimos game was used to portray a fictional game played by a football team called "The Stallions". As the footage showed Kent Austin playing and wearing the No. 5 jersey, the actor playing the quarterback wore a jersey bearing that number throughout the television episode. When a scene required seeing the quarterback in play, they used footage of Kent Austin.

Career statistics

This QB rating may be based on NFL system.

Coaching career
In 2003, Austin entered coaching as the quarterbacks coach of the Ottawa Renegades of the Canadian Football League (CFL). The following year, he was hired as Toronto offensive coordinator, helping lead the team to an offensive surge that allowed the franchise to win the 2004 Grey Cup. He was fired in the 2006 season and later hired as Saskatchewan Roughriders head coach for the 2007 season.

On November 25, 2007, Austin coached the Saskatchewan Roughriders to the 95th Grey Cup Championship beating the Winnipeg Blue Bombers 23–19. In doing so, Austin became the first head coach to win a professional football championship for the same team with which he won the championship as a quarterback. He did so in his first year as head coach, and at the same stadium where he won the cup as a player, 18 years earlier. His performance as head coach won him the 2007 Annis Stukus Trophy as CFL coach of the year.

On January 16, 2008, Austin accepted the job as Offensive coordinator at the University of Mississippi, his alma mater, to serve under head coach Houston Nutt. In 2008 Austin's offense ranked 28th nationally scoring 32 points a game up from 20 points a game in 2007.

On January 26, 2010 Austin accepted the head coaching job at Cornell University replacing Jim Knowles who left Cornell to become the defensive coordinator for David Cutcliffe at Duke University.

On December 17, 2012, Austin signed on as the head coach, general manager and Vice President of Football Operations of the Hamilton Tiger-Cats of the CFL.  He led the Tiger-Cats to consecutive Grey Cup appearances in his first two years as head coach. On March 11, 2016, he appointed Eric Tillman to replace his as general manager.

On August 24, 2017, Austin stepped down as head coach and appointed June Jones as his replacement. On April 12, 2018, Austin stepped down as Vice President of Football Operations of the Tiger-Cats and became a consultant for the team.

Head coaching record

CFL

College

References

External links
 Liberty profile
 

1963 births
Living people
American football quarterbacks
American players of Canadian football
BC Lions players
Canadian Football League executives
Canadian football quarterbacks
Cornell Big Red football coaches
Hamilton Tiger-Cats general managers
Liberty Flames football coaches
Ole Miss Rebels football coaches
Ole Miss Rebels football players
Ottawa Renegades coaches
People from Natick, Massachusetts
St. Louis Cardinals (football) players
Saskatchewan Roughriders coaches
Saskatchewan Roughriders players
Sportspeople from Middlesex County, Massachusetts
Toronto Argonauts coaches
Toronto Argonauts players
Winnipeg Blue Bombers players